Goran Ivanišević was the defending champion but lost in the semifinals to Jaime Yzaga.

Yzaga won in the final 6–4, 4–6, 7–6(7–4), 7–6(9–7) against Petr Korda.

Seeds

  Jim Courier (quarterfinals)
  Boris Becker (first round)
  Andriy Medvedev (second round)
  Goran Ivanišević (semifinals)
  Richard Krajicek (first round)
  Petr Korda (final)
  Ivan Lendl (first round)
  Wally Masur (second round)

Draw

Finals

Section 1

Section 2

External links
 1993 Ansett Australian Indoor Championships draw

Singles